The Gornjak Monastery, also known as Ždrelo (Ждрело), is a 14th-century Serbian Orthodox monastery located in the vicinity of today's city of Petrovac na Mlavi, Serbia.

Gornjak monastery is located in Gornjacka gorge, between Žagubica and Petrovac na Mlavi. Construction of the monastery was finished in 1380 by Starats (Elder) Grigorije and his brethren, and the founder was king Lazar of Serbia.

See also
Monument of Culture of Exceptional Importance
Tourism in Serbia

Cultural Monuments of Great Importance (Serbia)
Serbian Orthodox monasteries in Serbia
Christian monasteries established in the 14th century
14th-century Serbian Orthodox church buildings
Tourist attractions in Serbia
14th-century establishments in Serbia
Medieval sites in Serbia
Medieval Serbian Orthodox monasteries
Cave monasteries